Vile Parle Assembly constituency is one of the 288 Vidhan Sabha constituencies of Maharashtra state in western India.

Overview
Vile Parle (constituency number 167) is one of the 26 Vidhan Sabha constituencies located in the Mumbai Suburban district. The number of electors in 2009 was 272,381 (male 145,088, female 127,293).

Vile Parle is part of the Mumbai North Central Lok Sabha constituency along with five other Vidhan Sabha segments, namely Kalina, Chandivali, Kurla, Vandre West and Vandre East in the Mumbai Suburban district.

Members of the legislative assembly

^ by-poll

Election results

Assembly Elections 2019

Assembly Elections 2014

Assembly Elections 2009

Assembly Elections 2004

Assembly Elections 1972
 Kantaben Chandulal Shah (INC) : 39,531 votes  
 Pranlal Harkishandas Vora (NCO) : 14,841

See also
 Vile Parle
 List of constituencies of Maharashtra Vidhan Sabha

References

Assembly constituencies of Mumbai
Politics of Mumbai Suburban district
Assembly constituencies of Maharashtra